Billy Boyd may refer to:

Billy Boyd (ice hockey) (1898–1940), Canadian ice hockey forward
Billy Boyd (footballer) (1905–1967), Scottish professional footballer
Billy Boyd (politician) (born c. 1921), Northern Ireland Labour Party activist
Billy Boyd (actor) (born 1968), Scottish actor

See also
William Boyd (disambiguation)